Pareuxoa sanctisebastiani is a moth of the family Noctuidae. It is found in the Magallanes and Antartica Chilena Region of Chile.

The wingspan is 26–30 mm. Adults are on wing in December.

External links
 Noctuinae of Chile

Noctuinae
Endemic fauna of Chile